Gerald Glaskin (G. M. Glaskin) (16 December 1923 – 11 March 2000) was an Australian author.

Biography

Early life
Gerald Marcus Glaskin was born on 16 December 1923 in North Perth in Western Australia.

He attended Perth Modern School and served in the Second World War in the Royal Australian Navy and Royal Australian Air Force.

Career
His published works were extensive. He wrote poetry, short stories, and novels. Some works also included issues of science fiction and new-age spiritual guidance related to the interpretation of dreams. He was also involved in the Western Australian Fellowship of Australian Writers.

Some sources claim that he won the Commonwealth Prize for Literature in 1955, but subsequent research has disproved this, finding that he was awarded a grant in 1957 which he could not retain due to living outside Australia at the time. His works were received more favourably in Europe than in Australia. He lived mostly in Asia and later the Netherlands, until returning to Perth in 1967. His extensive time overseas may have been because of the oppressive Australian moral climate of the period against homosexuality. In 1961, he had been charged with indecent exposure  on a Perth beach.

A resident of Cottesloe, he was enthusiastic for its beach environment. As a writer in Western Australia conditions were not always supportive of the profession.

His involvement with the Christos experiment saw his writing a number of books related to the subject.

His novel A Waltz Through the Hills was made into a 1988 film of the same title. His most commercially successful work was a novel about a homosexual love affair, No End To The Way (1965), published under the pseudonym Neville Jackson. Interviewed in later life about the novel, Glaskin said: "It was banned in Australia and the paperback publishers, Corgi, researched the Australian censorship laws, and discovered that the book could not be shipped to Australia. So they chartered planes and flew them in". It was not inspired by his relationship with noted genealogist Leo van de Pas (Leonardus Francisus Maria van de Pas, 1942–2016), whom he met in 1968 in a gay bar in Amsterdam, and lived with from then onwards till the end of his life.

He was also a silent financial partner in The Coffee Pot, a popular Perth meeting place for homosexuals, bohemians and students which was established in the 1950s by Dutch Indonesian migrants, and was then the city's only late night cafe.

In 1967 he met the British writer Iris Murdoch, who was visiting Australia. In a letter to her friend Brigid Brophy she wrote: ... the opera house is the most beautiful single object I've seen since getting here (with the possible exception of a West Australian novelist called Jerry Glaskin, whom I had reluctantly to leave behind in Perth).

Death
He died on 11 March 2000.

Works
 A world of our own, James Barrie. London, 1955 |
 A minor portrait (Barrie Books, London,  1957 — fiction)
 The mistress (Panther Books,  1957 — fiction)
 The Beach of Passionate Love (1959)
 A lion in the sun (Varrie and Rockliff, 1960 — fiction)
 A change of mind (Doubleday, 1960 — fiction)
 The land that sleeps: Travel and adventure in the virgin west of Australia (Doubleday, NY, 1960 — travel)
 A waltz through the hills (Barrie and Rockliff,  1961 — fiction)
 A small selection of short stories  (Barrie and Rockliff, 1962)
 Flight to landfall  (Barrie and Rockliff, 1963 — fiction)
 No End to the Way [pseudonym 'Neville Jackson'] (Corgi, London, 1965)
 The man who didn't count  (Delacorte Press, 1965 — fiction)
 The road to nowhere  (1967)
 Bird in my hands; a personal experience  (Jenkins, 1967)
 Windows of the mind: Discovering your past and future lives through massage and mental exercise (Wildwood House, London, 1974)
 Two women: Two novellas  (Ure Smith, Sydney, 1975)
 Worlds within: Probing the Christos experience (Wildwood House, London, 1976)
 A door to infinity: Proving the Christos experience (Wildwood House, London, 1979)
 One way to wonderland  (1984)
 A many-splendored woman: A memoir of Han Suyin  (Graham Brash, Singapore, 1995)

Bibliography

 Burbidge, John  Dare Me! The Life and Work of Gerald Glaskin, Monash University Publishing, 2014

References

1923 births
2000 deaths
20th-century Australian novelists
20th-century Australian male writers
20th-century Australian poets
Australian male novelists
Australian science fiction writers
Australian self-help writers
Australian male short story writers
Australian gay writers
Australian LGBT novelists
Writers from Perth, Western Australia
Australian male poets
20th-century Australian short story writers
20th-century Australian LGBT people
Australian LGBT poets